Tuscaloosa is a live album by Canadian / American musician Neil Young, released on June 7, 2019, on Reprise Records. It is Volume 04 in the Performance Series of Neil Young Archives. 

The album features recordings from the February 5, 1973, concert at Tuscaloosa, Alabama, which was part of Young's Time Fades Away tour with his backing band The Stray Gators. Unlike the album Time Fades Away, which was compiled from later tour dates, the lineup features drummer Kenny Buttrey (who was later replaced by Johnny Barbata). The album doesn't feature the whole concert, as not all the songs were captured to tape, while "The Loner" and "On the Way Home" were not included for various reasons ("The Loner" eventually was made available for streaming for Archives subscribers in 2020).

The album was also included in the Archives Volume II boxset released in 2020.

Critical reception

Track listing
All songs written by Neil Young.

Personnel
Source
 Neil Young – vocals, guitar, piano, harmonica
The Stray Gators 
 Ben Keith – pedal steel, slide guitar, vocals
 Jack Nitzsche – piano, vocals
 Tim Drummond – bass
 Kenny Buttrey – drums

Engineering and production
 Neil Young, Elliot Mazer – production
 John Hanlon – mixing
 Chris Bellman – mastering
 Joel Bernstein – photos

Charts

References

2019 live albums
Neil Young live albums
Albums produced by Elliot Mazer
Reprise Records live albums